The Arz is a  long river in the Morbihan département, northwestern France. Its source is at Plaudren. It flows generally east-southeast. It is a right tributary of the Oust into which it flows at Saint-Jean-la-Poterie, near Redon.

Communes along its course
This list is ordered from source to mouth: Plaudren, Monterblanc, Elven, Le Cours, Larré, Molac, Pluherlin, Malansac, Saint-Gravé, Peillac, Saint-Jacut-les-Pins, Saint-Vincent-sur-Oust, Allaire, Saint-Perreux, Saint-Jean-la-Poterie

References

Rivers of France
Rivers of Brittany
Rivers of Morbihan